Bayraktar VTOL is a vertical take-off and landing (VTOL) unmanned aerial vehicle system developed by Baykar Defense, and announced for the first time in 2019. Bayraktar VTOL is expected to be used in the Landing helicopter dock TCG Anadolu.

Technicial Specifications

General Features 

 Wing Span: 5 meters
 Body length: 1.5 meters
 Maximum Takeoff Weight: 30 kilograms
 Useful Load Capacity: 5 kilograms

Performance 

 Maximum speed: 80 knots
 Communication Range: 150 km
 Operational Altitude: 9,000 feet
 Maximum Altitude: 15,000 feet
 Duration of stay in the air: 12 hours

Advanced Features 

 Fully automatic flight
 Autonomous landing and take-off
 Semi-autonomous flight
 Triple redundant flight control system
 Laser distance meter

See also 

 Baykar Bayraktar TB-2
 Baykar Bayraktar Akıncı
 TUSAŞ Anka
 TUSAŞ Aksungur

References

External links 

 Official page

Unmanned aerial vehicles of Turkey
Unmanned aerial vehicles
VTOL aircraft